Air Andaman was an airline based in Bangkok, Thailand. It was a regional carrier operating a small network of domestic and international services, as well as charter flights. The airline ceased all operations in 2004.

Code data
IATA Code: 2Y
ICAO Code: ADW
Callsign: Air Andaman

History
The airline was established in 2000 and started operations on October 29, 2000. It was one of several new carriers formed to take advantage of the deregulation of the air transport industry in Thailand and the Thai government's "Open Skies" policy, which came into effect on September 1, 2000.

Air Andaman's services included a domestic route between Bangkok and Phuket and flights to Singapore. In 2003-04 it had an extensive network with 13 regional destinations served from Bangkok and Chiang Mai.

But by the end of 2004, the airline was defunct. In March 2006, Thailand's Civil Aviation Department said it was withdrawing the airline's license.

The airline's major shareholders were Atichart Athakravi and Prathip Boonprasom, who in March 2006 was planning a comeback with German investor Hubert Joseph Trunser and Swiss investor Bernan Luthee in a joint venture called Asian Aerospace Service. The new airline aimed to run chartered flights from Bangkok with two Jetstream aircraft.

Fleet
The Air Andaman fleet consisted of the following aircraft (at 2003-04):
3 Fokker 50 based in Bangkok
2 BAe Jetstream 31 based in Chiang Mai

References
 Sritama, Suchat (March 7, 2006) "Phuket Air angles for new name, license, The Nation.

External links
Air Andaman
Air Andaman fleet history at Thai-Aviation.net

Defunct airlines of Thailand
Airlines established in 2000
Airlines disestablished in 2004
2004 disestablishments in Thailand
Companies based in Bangkok
Thai companies established in 2000